Marcus Hansson (born 12 February 1990) is a Swedish footballer who plays as a defender and is currently without a club.

Career
Hansson started out playing for Åbyggeby FK before spending one season at lower division Gävle based club Brynäs IF. At the age of 17 he made the move to the local top tier Allsvenskan club Gefle IF where he would stay for seven years and become team captain in 2014. After the 2014 Allsvenskan season had ended he was given the most valuable player award by the Gefle fans and signed with Norwegian side Tromsø.

In Norway Hansson was involved in a controversial situation when a rough tackle on Bjørn Helge Riise caused his brother John Arne Riise to lash out against Hansson in the media, comparing the tackle to a criminal act. In February 2016 Djurgårdens IF announced that they had bought Hansson from his Norwegian club with the intention of using him as a central defender in their upcoming season.

International career
Hansson has represented Sweden at the U17, U19 and U21 youth levels.

Personal life
Hansson has mixed his career of playing professional football with studying economics at university.

References

External links

Elitefootball profile

1990 births
Living people
Swedish footballers
Sweden under-21 international footballers
Sweden youth international footballers
Association football midfielders
Association football defenders
Djurgårdens IF Fotboll players
Gefle IF players
Tromsø IL players
IK Frej players
IF Brommapojkarna players
Allsvenskan players
Superettan players
Eliteserien players
Swedish expatriate footballers
Expatriate footballers in Norway
Swedish expatriate sportspeople in Norway